Feel Good to Die is a 2018 South Korean television series based on the Daum webcomic of the same name, starring Kang Ji-hwan, Baek Jin-hee and Gong Myung. It aired on KBS2's Wednesdays and Thursdays at 22:00 (KST) time slot, from November 7 to December 27, 2018.

Synopsis
The story of “evil boss” Baek Jin-sang and assistant manager Lee Roo-da, who tries to transform him into a better person. Both of them are stuck in a time loop and they are trying to find the problem that is causing this.

Cast

Main
 Kang Ji-hwan as Baek Jin-sang
 Baek Jin-hee as Lee Roo-da
 Gong Myung as Kang Jun-ho

Supporting

Marketing Team
Ryu Hyun-kyung as Choi Min-joo
Kim Min-jae as Park Yoo-deok
Jung Min-ah as Lee Jung-hwa

MW Chicken
Park Sol-mi as Yoo Shi-baek
In Gyo-jin as Kang In-han
Lee Byung-joon as Na Cheol-soo

Others
Kim Ki-hyeon as Kang Soo-chan 
Jo Han-chul as Yoon Dong-chan
Seo Jeong-yeon as Ahn Seon-nyeo
Jang Yoo-sang as Lee Young-doo
Kim Ye-won as Yoon-mi
Kim Bo-jung as Lee Roo-ri

Special appearances
Kim Won-hae
Yoo Min-sang
Kim Seon-ho

Original soundtrack

Part 1

Part 2

Part 3

Part 4

Part 5

Part 6

Ratings
 In the table below,  represent the lowest ratings and  represent the highest ratings.
 N/A denotes that the rating is not known.

Awards and nominations

References

External links
  
 
 
 

Korean Broadcasting System television dramas
2018 South Korean television series debuts
2018 South Korean television series endings
Korean-language television shows
South Korean romantic comedy television series
Television shows based on South Korean webtoons